Hotokezawa Dam is an earthfill dam located in Akita Prefecture in Japan. The dam is used for irrigation. The catchment area of the dam is 14.1 km2. The dam impounds about 14  ha of land when full and can store 1128 thousand cubic meters of water. The construction of the dam was completed in 1935.

References

Dams in Akita Prefecture
1935 establishments in Japan